KVNT (1020 AM) is an American commercial radio station in Eagle River, Alaska, broadcasting to the Anchorage, Alaska, area. KVNT was a simulcast of KLEF 98.1 FM (as KAXX) until February 12, 2007.  Its studios are located on Business Park Boulevard in Anchorage, and its transmitter is located in Knik, Alaska.

1020 AM is a North American clear-channel frequency; KVNT shares Class A status with KDKA in Pittsburgh, Pennsylvania.

The FCC had granted the estate of the licensee permission to remain silent (called an STA) for 6 months in order to work out the details of transferring the license to another party. . If the station stayed silent for a period of 12 months, the license was to expire as a matter of law.

KAXX returned to the air January 19, 2008. The station then began airing a business news format. KAXX changed their call letters to KABA on March 28, 2008. The station is now owned by Alaska Integrated Media of Anchorage, Alaska.

KABA signed off once again September 15, 2008, this time due to transmitter failure. The station changed its call letters to KOAN on June 9, 2009; the KOAN call letters were previously used on channel 6 in Anchorage (a low-power station operating as an 87.7 FM station), which took the KABA call letters and business format.

KOAN returned to the airwaves in December 2010 under the moniker FOX News Talk 1020 using local talent from the now-silent progressive talk sister station KUDO and Fox News Radio personalities in other dayparts.

On November 20, 2013, KOAN changed their call letters to KVNT and rebranded as Valley News Talk 1020.

References

External links

VNT
News and talk radio stations in the United States
Radio stations established in 1987
1987 establishments in Alaska